Jaana Na Dil Se Door (English: Don't Go Away From My Heart) is an Indian television series which aired on Star Plus. It starred Vikram Singh Chauhan, Shivani Surve and Shashank Vyas. The show also features Sara Khan, Smita Bansal, Vineet Kumar and Shilpa Tulaskar in key roles. The show ended on 30 June 2017.

Plot
Vividha is happy in her world in Ajmer. Her father, Kailash Kashyap, is her hero. Kailash strongly believes that relationships are only possible between individuals who are equal in social status. Atharv, who is not equal and without a father's name, does not fit the perfect match that Kailash wants for his daughter. Therefore, Kailash is against Atharv.

Over a series of encounters, Atharv falls in love with Vividha. He announces that after establishing his business, he will marry Vividha. This infuriates Kailash and he sabotages any chances of Atharv's success. Kailash frames Atharv and gets him arrested. Sujata, Atharv's mother, begs Kailash to get her son out of jail. Kailash asks for her house in exchange for her son's freedom and demands that they leave the city. Sujata agrees and decides to take Atharv to Delhi.

Kailash arranges Vividha's marriage with the son of a wealthy family and they come to see her. It is then that Vividha finds out that Atharv is leaving the city. She stops him from leaving. Atharv and his mother have nowhere to live, since Kailash took their home, but Sujata had bought the land in front of their house. They begin to live there and slowly Vividha realises that she loves Atharv as well. But Kailash is still not ready for their marriage

Later, Atharv's father, Ramakant Vashisht who is a Colonel in Indian Army, comes back home with only a little time left to live. He asks Sujata to let him meet his son. He promises to unite Atharv and Vividha. He talks to Kailash about their marriage, but dies before their discussion can conclude. Kailash takes advantage of this and tells Ramakant's second family about his last wish to marry his daughter Vividha to their son Ravish. While unclear about Ramakant's last wish, they believe Kailash and fix the Vividha-Ravish alliance. 

Kailash meanwhile tells his own and Sujata's family that he has agreed to Atharv and Vividha's marriage. Preparations begin, but on the day of the marriage, Uma, Vividha's mother, finds out Kailash's real intentions of taking Vividha to Delhi for her marriage with Ravish. Uma tells Vividha and asks her to meet Atharv who awaits her at a temple. Vividha tells Atharv everything. They take their seven rounds and Atharv promises to return if they get separated. 

Kailash goes to the temple and attacks Atharv. To stop her father from killing Atharv, she agrees to marry whoever Kailash wants her to. To revenge herself on her father, Vividha is adamant about wedding Ravish and then ruining the marriage with him. Her mother begs her not to take a step that spoils the life of an innocent man, but Vividha does not listen.

On the day of their marriage, Ravish has to participate in an emergency mission for the Indian Army. Vividha hopes that he might die in the mission. However, after successfully completing it, Ravish marries Vividha. After their marriage, Vividha is rude to Ravish who is confused with her behaviour and asks her the reason behind it. Vividha lies about her willingness to marry him, but continues to cheat Ravish. She later feels ashamed since he and his family are extremely good to her. Eventually Ravish falls in love with Vividha.

Ravish's mother Suman loves Vividha just as much as her own daughter and always supports her. Ravish performs the duties of a good husband. After seeing the goodness of Ravish's family, Vividha starts to behave better, but still does not tell them the truth. Vividha starts feeling Atharv's presence in the house, but thinks that she is just imagining him. It is later revealed that Atharv is alive, and he and his mother, Sujata are hidden in the care of Ravish as Atharv is Ravish's half-brother. Atharv has lost his mental balance after getting beaten up by Kailash's goons. After some days, Vividha finds out that Atharv is in the house under Ravish's care, but soon realizes that he has lost his mental balance.

Vividha goes to Kailash's house, but does not find him. Uma informs her that Kailash is missing and the police think that he is dead, but Vividha does not believe this. She informs everyone about Atharv's mental imbalance, breaks all ties with Kailash, and vows to break ties with Ravish and help Atharv become normal again. Meanwhile, Sujata finds out that Vividha is Ravish's wife. She decides to leave Ravish's home as she doesn't want Vividha to come back into Atharv's life. Ravish tries to stop her. Vividha returns home, and Sujata slaps Vividha and tells Ravish the truth. Vividha is forced to confess to Ravish that she still loves Atharv.

Ravish is heartbroken, but decides to help them reunite and asks for some time to reveal the truth to his family. Vividha agrees and decides to hide her relationship with Atharv. After a few days, Atharv and Sujata's secret is revealed before the family. Suman wants to throw them out from the house, but Ravish convinces her that Sujata and Atharv have equal right to the house. Meanwhile, Guddi (Vividha's sister) comes to the Vashisht house and is attracted towards Ravish. Understanding Guddi's intention, Vividha tries to send her back to Ajmer, but Guddi refuses to go back and decides to reveal Atharv and Vividha's secret. Just as she is about to, she dies by falling down the stairs. Everyone thinks it was an accident, but Vividha thinks it was murder. 

Ravish's enemy Zeenat enters the house in order to attack Ravish and his family, as Ravish had arrested Zeenat's husband who is a terrorist. Terrorists, led by Zeenat, attack the Vashisht family. Ravish rescues his family, but both Ravish and Atharv are hurt during the fight.

The Vashisht family realizes the truth about Atharv and Vividha which makes Dadaji angry. He tries to kill Atharv, but Vividha catches him, so he tries to kill Vividha instead. Atharv fights with Dadaji to save Vividha. Dadaji hurts Atharv and throws him in a deep pond. Meanwhile, Ravish arrives and realizing what has happened, arrests his grandfather. The rescue team searches for Atharv but in vain. Everyone assumes that Atharv is dead, but Sujata and Vividha feel that he is still alive.

After Suman persuades Sujata, they perform Atharv's last rites thinking that he is dead. Vividha declares herself a widow and decides to divorce Ravish. But Sujata asks Vividha to take "ulta pheras" (ritual of breaking marriage). Vividha begs Ravish to agree to breaking the marriage with her. When they are about to take ulta pheras, Atharv who has regained his memory, arrives. Later, Vividha decides to go back to Ajmer with Atharv.

Meanwhile, Ravish is attacked by the terrorists, but returns home safely after fighting them off. When Ravish returns, Atharv and Vividha are confused about their reunion. Ravish makes their way clear by divorcing Vividha. On their wedding day, Atharv runs away from the marriage while Vividha waits for him. After this betrayal, Vividha again begs Ravish to give their marriage another chance and to start a new life. She marries Ravish for a second time. It is revealed that Ravish agreed to remarry Vividha to hide her pregnancy and save her from society's taunts because she conceived Atharv's child without an official divorce from her legally wedded husband, Ravish.

Four years later
Vividha and Ravish are shown to be married, living happily with Sujata and Vividha's family in Vividha's home, and they have a son named Madhav. Ravish has been performing all the duties of a good husband and father, while Atharv has become a big business man and is shown to be living with Suman in her house as her son with the new name Raghav Suman. He is married to Guddi who is pregnant. Later, it is revealed that Guddi never died. Guddi and Suman are feeding Atharv drugs.

Madhav becomes ill and the doctor informs Vividha and Ravish about a rare disease that Madhav is suffering from. To cure the disease, the doctor wants Madhav's father's DNA sample. At this time, Vividha reveals to the family that Madhav is Atharv's son. Vividha enters Raghav's house in disguise with Madhav. Suman doubts Madhav's presence in the house. Vividha promises to get Atharv's DNA sample. Kalindi sets out to kill Atharv.

Suman gets shot by Sujata when she attempts to kill Atharv. Sujata is arrested for killing Suman. As the trial begins, Ravish saves Sujata. Vividha reveals Guddi's misdeeds in front of everyone. As soon as Atharv returns, Vividha forgets all the sacrifices made by Ravish and decides to go back to Atharv. Ravish, being a true gentleman, again releases Vividha. Vividha completes her third marriage with Atharv and they happily leave for their honeymoon.

Meanwhile, Ravish's car hits a lady. He takes the mysterious lady home after the accident. The girl is named Kangana by the family members as she has forgotten her past. Ravish starts developing sympathy for Kangana, but learns that she is behind the disappearance of Kalindi and the murder of Bhoomi and Vipul. The real name of Kangana is Tara and she is the real mother of Madhav. She is just a pawn in the hand of Kailash Kashyap who exchanged Tara's son, Madhav, with Vividha's daughter, Khushi. Vividha refuses to share Madhav with Kangana. Then Kangana marries Ravish to get custody of her son Madhav. Ravish is once again fooled as he is innocent.

Vividha goes to the temple and finds Kailash there in a very bad condition. She takes him home. Atharv gets angry upon seeing Kailash and is afraid of losing Vividha again. Ravish realizes that Kailash is normal. Ravish opposes Vividha's decision to let Kailash to stay in the Vashisht house, but Vividha fights with him. Vividha blames Kangana and Ravish and says that they are trying to kill Kailash.

Ravish and Kangana try to reveal Kailash's true face. During this process, Ravish is stabbed by Kailash. Vividha sees Ravish's body with the knife wound. She sees the knife in Khushi's hand and takes the blame upon herself. Atharv says that he will never believe that Vividha killed Ravish. It is revealed that Kailash has killed Ravish to separate Atharv and Vividha. Kailash takes Madhav away to Ajmer. He orders Vividha to marry a rich man threatening to kill Madhav if she does not. She is ready to marry Vivek. Atharv reaches Ajmer and saves Madhav. 

Kailash and Atharv have a big fight. Kailash remembers the time he spent with Vividha and shoots himself. He dies on the spot. The show then takes a three-month leap in time to show that Sujata and the Kashyaps are living happily.

Cast

Main
Vikram Singh Chauhan as Atharv Vashisht: Ramakant and Sujata's son, Suman's step-son, Aditi and Ravish's half-brother, Vividha's husband, Khushi's father and Madhav's foster father (2016–2017)
Shivani Surve as Vividha Kashyap Vashisht: Uma and Kailash's Eldest daughter, Guddi and Ankit's Elder sister, Atharv's wife, Ravish's former wife, Khushi's mother and Madhav's foster mother, A flipper who kept using Ravish as per her convinience(2016–2017)
Shashank Vyas as Ravish Vashisht: Army officer; Ramakant and Suman's son; Sujata's step-son; Vividha former husband; Aditi's brother; Atharv's half-brother; Kangana's husband and Madhav's step-father (2016–2017)

Recurring
Vineet Kumar as Kailash Kashyap: Indumati Devi's son; Uma's husband; Vividha, Guddi and Ankit's father (2016–2017) 
Shilpa Tulaskar as Sujata Vashisht: Ramakant's first wife; Atharv's mother; Aditi and Ravish's step-mother (2016–2017)
Smita Bansal as Suman Vashisht: Ramakant's second wife; Atharv's step-mother; Ravish and Aditi's mother (2016–2017) 
Prashant Bhatt as Ramakant Vashisht: Colonel; Vashisht's son;Sujata and Suman's husband; Atharv, Ravish and Aditi's father (2016)(Cameo) 
Sara Khan as Kangana "Tara" Vashisht: Ravish's second wife and Madhav mother (2017) 
 Kinshuk Mahajan as Vivek (2017)
Aparna Ghoshal as Uma Kashyap: Kailash's wife; Vividha; Guddi and Ankit's mother (2016–2017)
Kabir Shah as Madhav Soni: Kangana's son from her first marriage; Ravish's step-son, Vividha and Atharv foster son (2017)
Kenisha Chadha as Khushi Vashisht: Vividha and Atharv's daughter (2017)
Nidhi Shah / Priyanka Kandwal as Shweta "Guddi" Kashyap: Kailash and Uma's daughter; Vividha and Ankit's younger sister (2016–2017)
Ruslaan Sayed as Ankit Kashyap: Kailash and Uma's son; Vividha's younger brother (2016–2017)
Sana Sayyad as Aditi Vashisht: Ramakant and Suman's daughter; Ravish's sister and Atharv's half-sister (2016–2017)
Surendra Pal as  Vashisht: Brigadier General; Ratna's brother;Ramakant's father; Ravish, Aditi, Atharv and Vipul's grandfather (2016–2017)
Manmohan Tiwari as Vipul Vashisht: Kalindi's son and Bhumi's husband (2016–2017) 
Sulakshana Khatri as Indumati Devi Kashyap: Kailash's mother; Vividha, Guddi and Ankit's grandmother (2016–2017)
Aaradhna Uppal as Kalindi Vashisht: Vipul's mother (2016–2017)
Aparna Kanekar as Ratna Vashisht: Amarkant's sister (2016–2017)
Bhavini Purohit as Bhumi Vashisht: Vipul's wife (2016–2017) 
Pawan Shankar as Dr. Rajat Kumar Shastri (2016–2017)
Firoza Khan as Zeenat "Aruna" Siddiqui: Ravish's enemy and Adaa's mother (2016)
Palak Panchal as Adaa "Chutki" Siddiqui: Zeenat's daughter (2016)
Parvez Magray as Chintu Zaveri: Vividha's friend (2016–2017)
Maksood Akhtar as Abdul: Sujata's neighbour (2016–2017)

Awards and nominations

Soundtrack

References

External links

Hotstar

StarPlus original programming
2016 Indian television series debuts
2017 Indian television series endings
Indian television series
Indian television soap operas
Serial drama television series
Hindi-language television shows
Indian drama television series
Television shows set in Rajasthan